Gabriel José Correa Guzmán (born 17 February 1989 in Maracay, Venezuela) is a former baseball player. He is currently a model, actor, Mister Venezuela 2015 and Mister Supranational 2017.

Biography
Gabriel was born in the city of Maracay. From an early age, he was interested in baseball, but in his career, he suffered a tendon injury to his right arm that forced him to quit playing and also prevented him from joining the big leagues He started work as a model in 2008, but put his career on hold to focus on his Industrial Production studies.

Mister Venezuela
In 2015, Gabriel participated in the 14th edition of the Mister Venezuela competition held on 23 May 2015 at Venevisión studios in Caracas.  At the end of the competition, he won the title of Mister Venezuela.

Acting
After joining Venevisión, Gabriel was cast in the upcoming telenovela to be produced by the network titled Entre tu amor y mi amor making his debut in acting. In 2016, Gabriel joined the Acting Studio in Miami to continue improving on his acting skills.

Filmography

References

External links
 
 
 
 Mister Supranational Venezuela Official Website
 Mister Supranacional Official Website

Male beauty pageant winners
Living people
Venezuelan male models
1989 births
Venezuelan male telenovela actors
People from Maracay